Morne-à-l'Eau (Monalô in creole) is a commune located in the department of Guadeloupe.

Events 

In March or April each year since 1993, the town organises a crab festival which features crab races and many stalls selling crab-based dishes. In 2008 the event's 18th edition attracted over 20,000 visitors and included a Brazilian music plus a cycle-race passing through the already congested town.

Hamlets 

Béguette, Berlette, Blanchette, Boisvin, Bosrédon, Belle-Espérance, Blain, Blanchet, Bonne-Terre, Le Bourg (Grippon), Brion, Bubelloy, Chastel, Chaumette, Chazeau, Chevalier, Chouioutte, Clugny, Cocoyer, Croustère, Dubelloy, Dubisquet, Espérance, Geffrier, Gensolin, Lemesle, Lola, Jabrun, Jabrun-Saint-Cyr, Labuthie, Lasserre, Lebraire, Marchand, Marieulle, Perrin, Pierrefite, Point-à-Retz, Quirine, Réduit, Rousseau, Richeval, Salette, Sauvia, Vieux-Bourg, et Zabeth.

Population

Politics

Education
Public preschools include:
 Ecole maternelle Jeanne Benin Morne -à -l'eau
 Ecole maternelle Edouard Nelson
 Ecole maternelle Pointe A Retz
 Ecole maternelle Bazile Bertaux Vieux-Bourg

Public primary schools include:
 Ecole primaire Labuthie Achille
 Ecole primaire Marcelle Blanchinet
 Ecole primaire Hyppolite Cocles
 Ecole primaire Félix Duport
 Ecole primaire Coco Marie Emilie
 Ecole primaire Ludger Marie
 Ecole primaire Ernest Pallas

Public elementary schools include:
 Ecole élémentaire Pierre Foucan Morne-à-l'eau

Public junior high schools include:
 Collège Charles de Gaulle

Public senior high schools include:
 LGT Faustin Fleret
 LP Gerty Archimede

Sports 
It is home to L'Etoile de Morne-à-l'Eau, a football team who have won the Coupe D.O.M.

Notable people
 Gerty Archimède (1909–1980), politician and lawyer.
 Éric Danty (1947–2020), football player.
Victoire Jasmin (born 1955), senator

See also
Jabrun, Guadeloupe
Communes of Guadeloupe

References

Communes of Guadeloupe
Guadeloupe communes articles needing translation from French Wikipedia